Joe Biden presidential campaign endorsements may refer to:
List of Joe Biden 2008 Presidential campaign endorsements
List of Joe Biden 2020 presidential campaign endorsements
List of Joe Biden 2020 presidential campaign primary endorsements
List of Joe Biden 2020 presidential campaign celebrity endorsements
List of Joe Biden 2020 presidential campaign endorsements from organizations
List of Joe Biden 2020 presidential campaign state and territorial legislative endorsements
List of Joe Biden 2020 presidential campaign U.S. Congress endorsements